Zijin Mining Group Co., Limited is a multi-national mining company headquartered in Mainland China.

Background
Zijin is a Shanghai Stock Exchange and Hong Kong Stock Exchange listed mining company  principally engaged in the prospecting, exploration, and mining of gold, copper, and other mineral resources with operations in 11 countries. Its largest shareholder Shanghang Minxi Xinghang State-Owned Property Investment Company, which holds 24% of Zijin, is owned by the government of Shanghang County, Fujian Province, where Zijin's head office is located.  Zijin is one of the largest gold, copper and zinc producers in China.

Activities
In 2006, Zijin had 49.28 tons of the gold output and the gold produced from mining reached 20.70 tons, respectively accounting for 20.53% of China's total gold production and 11.51% of the gold produced from mining in China in the same year.  In 2010 gold output had reached 69 tons but was expected to be only 37 tons in 2018, slightly less than the previous year.

In December 2019, Reuters reported that Zijin had agreed to buy Canadian miner Continental Gold Inc. for C$1.3 billion.  The company claimed that Continental's principal asset, the Buritica project, had gold reserves of 165.47 tons and an inferred reserve of 187.24 tons.

Equity Investments
Reference from the official website.

In October 2021 Zijin acquired junior lithium explorer Neo Lithium Corp. for C$960 million.

Incidents

Major acid spill
On July 3 and July 16, 2010 acid waste escaped the Fujian province copper plant and into the Ting River. The accident was said to be the size of the BP deepwater oil spill.  The copper plant manager, deputy manager and head of environment were detained because the company waited nine days before revealing the incident.

Fatalities at dam collapse
In September 2010, four people were killed when a dam collapsed at the Xinyi Yinyan tin mine, following heavy rain.  The dam collapse was said to be caused by rainfall generated by a typhoon occurring only once in more than 200 years.

Criticism

Air pollution in Bor, Serbia

Several protests has been held in Bor in eastern Serbia over excessive air pollution that has been intensified since Zijin took over copper miner Rudarsko-Topioničarski Basen (RTB) in late 2018. Since January 2019, Bor has been struggling with excessive air pollution, with sulfur dioxide (SO2) levels topping 2,000 micrograms per cubic meter, up from the maximum allowed 350. Protesters demanded that the city government urgently adopt a plan so that the line ministry and state inspectorates can react to the alarming pollution levels in Bor. As early as April 2019, the inspector had ordered the company to take action against air pollution of the environment, human health and the environment, because it emitted excessive SO2. Zijin then explained in a letter to the Ministry of Environment that the power outage had caused pollution. However, control a few months later, in August, showed another omission – Zijin did not have a system for wet dust removal during the transportation of tailings on the Bor mine, which also threatened human health and the environment. Zijin was ordered to solve the problem, and the company later told the Ministry that a dust suppression system had been installed, which was put to trial. In November 2019, CINS sought an interview with Zijin on the topic of air pollution, to which the company responded with a press release. It says that by the end of the year, the company will have a total of five SO2-neutralized dust spray machines. Documentation obtained by CINS shows that by that time, two of the machines purchased had been in operation for about two months, but pollution data showed that it had no significant effect on the reduction of sulfur dioxide.

Carbon footprint
Zijin Mining Group reported Total CO2e emissions (Direct + Indirect) for 31 December 2020 at 5,322 Kt (+1,279/+32% y-o-y). The growth accelerated relative to the long-term trend (+26% CAGR) observed since 4Q'17.

See also 
Gold mining in China

References

External links 
 

Companies formerly in the Hang Seng China Enterprises Index
Companies listed on the Hong Kong Stock Exchange
Companies listed on the Shanghai Stock Exchange
Companies in the CSI 100 Index
Gold mining companies of China
Civilian-run enterprises of China
H shares
Metal companies of China
Companies based in Longyan
Companies established in 1986
Companies established in 2000
Mass media companies
1986 establishments in China
2000 establishments in China